is a railway station in the city of Nisshin, Aichi, Japan, jointly operated by the Transportation Bureau City of Nagoya and private railway operator Nagoya Railroad (Meitetsu).

Lines

Station layout
The station has two underground island platforms serving a total of three tracks. There are wheelchair-accessible toilets and elevators. The station has automated ticket machines, Manaca automated turnstiles and is staffed.

Platforms

On both platforms, door 10 is closest to the elevator.

Adjacent stations

History 
The Nagoya Subway station opened on 1 October 1978. The Meitetsu Toyota Line opened on 29 July 1979, from which date through-running between the two lines commenced.

Passenger statistics
In fiscal 2017, the station was used by an average of 30,778 passengers daily.

Surrounding area
Nagoya City Tram & Subway Museum 
Nisshin Nishi High School
Akaike Elementary School

See also
 List of railway stations in Japan
 Akaike Station (Gifu), a station in Gifu Prefecture with the same name

References

External links 

 Nagoya Subway station information 
 Meitetsu station information 

Railway stations in Japan opened in 1978
Railway stations in Aichi Prefecture
Stations of Nagoya Railroad
Nisshin, Aichi